Hongqiao Subdistrict is a subdistrict of Yuexiu District in the heart of Guangzhou, located near important landmarks such as Zhenhai Tower and the Sun Yat-sen Memorial Hall. , it has 11 residential communities under its administration.

See also 
 List of township-level divisions of Guangdong

References

External links 

Administrative divisions of Yuexiu District